Siddhpeeth Shri Shakumbhari Devi Temple is an important and ancient Hindu temple. It is situated in the Shivalik hills in Behat tehsil, 40 km from Saharanpur in Uttar Pradesh.

It is one of the most visited pilgrimage centers in India. Every year lakhs of visitors visits the temple. The two most prominent festivals celebrated at Siddhpeeth Shri Shakumbhari Devi Temple are Navratri and Diwali.

References

Hindu temples in Uttar Pradesh